= Brittonic =

Brittonic or Brythonic may refer to:

- Common Brittonic, or Brythonic, the Celtic language anciently spoken in Great Britain
- Brittonic languages, a branch of the Celtic languages descended from Common Brittonic
- Britons (Celtic people), or Celtic Britons, the Celtic people of Great Britain in ancient times
